Peter Gerber (8 June 1923 – 11 April 2012) was a Swiss politician and President of the Swiss Council of States (1985/1986).

External links 
 
 

Members of the Council of States (Switzerland)
Presidents of the Council of States (Switzerland)
1923 births
2012 deaths
Swiss People's Party politicians